Anna Berecz (4 September 1988, in Budapest) is a female skier from Hungary. She took part in the alpine skiing events at the 2010 Winter Olympics and the 2014 Winter Olympics. She has also competed in the FIS Alpine World Ski Championships 2007 and the FIS Alpine World Ski Championships 2009.

In the 2010 Winter Olympics, Berecz competed in the women's downhill, coming 35, super combined, 27, super-G, where she failed to finish, slalom, 45, and giant slalom, 42.

Results

FIS Alpine World Ski Championships 2007:Slalom–53Giant slalom–42FIS Alpine World Ski Championships 2009:Giant slalom–39Super-G–342010 Winter Olympics:
Downhill–35Super combined–27Super-G–DNFSlalom–45Giant slalom–42
2014 Winter Olympics:
Downhill–35Super combined–21Super-G–28Slalom–35Giant slalom–48

References

External links
 Anna Berecz at www.vancouver2010.com
 Anna Berecz at Yahoo! sports

1988 births
Living people
Hungarian female alpine skiers
Alpine skiers at the 2010 Winter Olympics
Alpine skiers at the 2014 Winter Olympics
Olympic alpine skiers of Hungary
Skiers from Budapest
21st-century Hungarian women